Armando Fernández García (born February 9, 1969) is a Mexican former sport wrestler from Xalapa, Veracruz, in eastern Mexico. Nicknamed "La Jarocha" he competed in Olympic wrestling in the 1990s appearing in Wrestling at the 1992 Summer Olympics - Men's Greco-Roman 57 kg and Wrestling at the 1996 Summer Olympics - Men's Greco-Roman 57 kg.

References

External links
 

1969 births
Living people
Wrestlers at the 1992 Summer Olympics
Wrestlers at the 1996 Summer Olympics
Mexican male sport wrestlers
Olympic wrestlers of Mexico
People from Xalapa
Sportspeople from Veracruz
Pan American Games bronze medalists for Mexico
Pan American Games medalists in wrestling
Wrestlers at the 1995 Pan American Games
Medalists at the 1995 Pan American Games
20th-century Mexican people